Kim-Anh Do is an Australian biostatistician of Vietnamese descent. She is the chair of the Department of Biostatistics in the University of Texas MD Anderson Cancer Center, and the holder of the Electa C. Taylor Chair for Cancer Research at the center. She also holds adjunct professorships at Texas A&M University and Rice University.

Do did her undergraduate studies at the University of Queensland, in mathematics and computer science. She then went to Stanford University for graduate study in statistics. She completed her Ph.D. in 1990 with a dissertation Some Results in Statistical Modeling and Estimation for Software Reliability Problems supervised by Jerome H. Friedman.

With Geoffrey McLachlan and Christophe Ambroise, Do is the author of Analyzing Microarray Gene Expression Data (Wiley, 2004).

Do is a fellow of the American Association for the Advancement of Science, the American Statistical Association, and the Royal Statistical Society. She is an elected member of the International Statistical Institute.

References

External links
Home page

Year of birth missing (living people)
Living people
American statisticians
Australian statisticians
Australian people of Vietnamese descent
Women statisticians
Biostatisticians
University of Queensland alumni
Stanford University alumni
University of Texas MD Anderson Cancer Center faculty
Texas A&M University faculty
Rice University faculty
Elected Members of the International Statistical Institute
Fellows of the American Association for the Advancement of Science
Fellows of the American Statistical Association
Fellows of the Royal Statistical Society